Domínio Público is a Digital library created by the Brazilian government, under the Secretaria de Educação à Distância do Ministério da Educação (the Secretariat for Distance Education of the Ministry of Education), with the goal of harnessing the diffusion of cultural works under public domain. It contains more than 10,000 works in text format and another 4,000 in other formats (music, video, images etc.), the majority in Portuguese. literary works are in PDF format, and include contributions from different Brazilian universities (and their respective virtual libraries), international organisms as UNESCO, and the work of volunteers and similar organizations (it contains many works in English contributed from Project Gutenberg, for example).

Although it focuses on works by Brazilian authors and in Portuguese, it accepts collaborations in all languages, provided that they are in the public domain. In order to facilitate the work of volunteers and prospective contributors, the Domínio Público web site maintains a list of Brazilian authors with works under public domain, prepared by the National Library of Brazil.

External links
 Domínio Público.

Geographic region-oriented digital libraries
Aggregation-based digital libraries
Public domain databases
Internet properties with year of establishment missing
Portuguese-language websites
Brazilian digital libraries